The Honda NSR250 and Honda RS250RW were race motorcycles manufactured by Honda Racing Corporation to race in the 250cc class of the Grand Prix motorcycle World Championship. 
Both names identified the factory specification bikes entrusted to works teams, while customer teams used the production racer Honda RS250R.

In  the RS250RW name was resurrected until the demise of the 250 cc class.

The 250 cc class world championship was won 11 times by riders riding the Honda RS250RW and NSR250: Freddie Spencer (1985), Anton Mang (1987), Sito Pons (1988, 1989), Luca Cadalora (1991, 1992), Max Biaggi (1997), Daijiro Kato (2001), Dani Pedrosa (2004, 2005) and Hiroshi Aoyama (2009).

Honda also mass-produced a road legal Honda NSR250R.

See also
 Honda NSR250R, The road legal race replica.

NSR250
Grand Prix motorcycles
Motorcycles introduced in 1985
Two-stroke motorcycles